Multiple projectile ammunition are rounds with more than one projectile inserted in the cartridge. An example is the Triplex variant of the M1911 pistol, with a barrel with three holes.

References

External links
 Schirnecker assault rifle
 
 

Ammunition